Ryan Eugene Stack (born July 24, 1975) is an American and naturalised Macedonian former professional basketball player.

Professional career
Stack, a 6 ft 11 in (211 cm) forward/center from the University of South Carolina, was selected by the Cleveland Cavaliers in the second round (48th overall) of the 1998 NBA Draft. He saw limited playing time in two seasons with the Cavaliers, as the backup to All-Star center Žydrūnas Ilgauskas.  After playing in just 43 games for the Cavaliers, Stack signed a contract to play in Europe, and played for Gijón team from Spain's ACB for the 2000–01 season.

The next season, Stack moved to Israel and was signed by the Maccabi Ramat Gan team. After the year in Israel, he moved to Greece and was signed by Aris Thessaloniki; he played there from 2002 to 2006. In all of those years with the team, he won the EuroCup Challenge in 2003, the Greek Cup in 2004 and reached the EuroCup final in 2006. He was then the highest paid center in Europe.

Stack was signed by Olympiacos, for whom he played one season, in August 2006. He then signed with the Ukrainian league team BC Kyiv.

North Macedonia national team
While playing for Aris Thessaloniki, Stack adopted the citizenship of North Macedonia and went by the name of Ruan Stik. That way he could play as a European on a Bosman passport, and thus not count as one of the two non-Europeans that were allowed per team in the Greek League at that time. He played for the North Macedonia in several FIBA EuroBasket and FIBA World Cup qualifications.

References

External links
NBA & college stats - basketballreference.com
Player Profile - ACB.com 

1975 births
Living people
American emigrants to North Macedonia
American expatriate basketball people in Greece
American expatriate basketball people in Israel
American expatriate basketball people in North Macedonia
American expatriate basketball people in Spain
American expatriate basketball people in Ukraine
American men's basketball players
Aris B.C. players
Basketball players from Nashville, Tennessee
BC Kyiv players
Centers (basketball)
Cleveland Cavaliers draft picks
Cleveland Cavaliers players
Gijón Baloncesto players
Greek Basket League players
Ironi Ramat Gan players
Israeli Basketball Premier League players
Liga ACB players
Macedonian men's basketball players
Olympiacos B.C. players
Power forwards (basketball)
South Carolina Gamecocks men's basketball players